Aston is a village about  south of Witney in West Oxfordshire, England. The village is part of the civil parish of Aston, Cote, Shifford and Chimney. The southern boundary of the parish is the River Thames. The 2011 Census recorded the parish's population as 1,374.

History
Until the 19th century Aston was a township in the ancient parish of Bampton. In 1866 the civil parish of Aston and Cote was separated from Bampton. In 1931 Aston and Cote was united with Chimney to form the civil parish of Aston Bampton, which was merged with Shifford in 1954 to form the parish of Aston Bampton and Shifford. The parish was later renamed Aston, Cote, Shifford and Chimney.

Parish church
The Church of England parish church of Saint James was built in 1839 with only a low squat tower and one bell. Later a spire and second bell were added. The Gothic Revival architect Joseph Clarke restored the building in 1862, even though it was only 23 years old at the time. The architect HGW Drinkwater made further alterations in 1885–89.  The present ring of six bells was cast by John Taylor & Co. of Loughborough in 1883, the two original bells being taken in part exchange. Two brass plates in the church commemorate the names of local clergy and churchwardens at the time of the bells' dedication and benefactors who contributed to the cost, the balance of which was raised by public subscription. In 1992 the bells were restored and re-hung by White's of Appleton following two years of local fund-raising.  In 1857 Aston, Cote and Shifford were made part of the ecclesiastical parish of Bampton Aston. It now forms part of the benefice of Bampton with Clanfield, which also includes the parish of Lew.

Pottery
Aston Pottery was founded in 1990 and now employs 50 people producing over 120 different patterns on 45 different shapes. The pottery also has a café and gardens.

References

Sources

External links

The Parish of Aston, Cote, Chimney & Shifford

West Oxfordshire District
Villages in Oxfordshire